The following is a list of notable people associated with Pepperdine University, located in the American city of Malibu, California.

Notable alumni

Academia
Mike Aamodt (B.A., 1978) – Industrial and organizational psychology researcher
Christopher Chetsanga (B.S., 1964) – Zimbabwean scientist who discovered two enzymes that repair damage to DNA
Michael O'Donnell – Adolescent wellness researcher 
Michael Shermer (B.A., 1976) – Founder of The Skeptics Society
Kirk Snyder (M.A., 1991) – LGBT business communication researcher

Business

Elizabeth Holmes, CEO of Theranos and recipient of a Doctorate ad honorem from Pepperdine University, then convicted for fraud (United States v. Elizabeth A. Holmes, et al.)
 Sophia Hutchins (B.S., 2019) – chief executive officer of LUMASOL and Executive Director of the Caitlyn Jenner Foundation
 Rick J. Caruso (J.D., 1983) – chief executive officer of Caruso Affiliated
 Benjamin de Rothschild (1984) – Chairman of the Edmond de Rothschild Group
Julia Hartz (B.A., 2001) – Founder and CEO of Eventbrite
George Randolph Hearst III (B.A. 1977) publisher of the Times Union newspaper in Albany, New York and director of the Hearst corporation
 Rod Menzies (MBA, 1988) – entrepreneur
Tiffany Monroe (Chief People Officer, H&R Block)
Oscar Munoz (M.B.A., 1986) – President and CEO of United Airlines
 Greg Popovich - (M.B.A. 1996) Owner Castle Rock Winery
 Nicolette Rankin - Entrepreneur
 Jeffrey Sprecher - Founder and CEO of Intercontinental Exchange and current chairman of the New York Stock Exchange
 Dean Stoecker – Founder, chairman and former CEO of Alteryx
 Robert Tchenguiz (LL.B., 1982) – London-based property tycoon
 Neil Clark Warren (1956) – chairman and co-founder of eHarmony.com
 Kelly Zong (B.A., 2004) – President of the Hangzhou Wahaha Group founded by her father, Zong Qinghou
 Jean Trebek - Entrepreneur, philanthropist, blogger, widow of game show host and television personality Alex Trebek

Entertainment
 Nicole Kidman - actress
 Les Baxter – soundtrack and exotica composer
 Brittany Dawn Brannon – Miss Teen America 2007 and Miss Arizona 2010
 D.J. Caruso – film director
 Marshall Colt – actor, McClain's Law; later marriage and family therapist in San Diego
 Chace Crawford – actor, Gossip Girl
 Pat Dubar - singer, Mind Funk
 Cami Edwards – cast member, Laguna Beach
 Douglas Emerson – former child actor, The Blob and Beverly Hills, 90210
 Kim Fields (1995) – actress, U.S. TV sitcoms The Facts of Life and Living Single
 Kimberly Forsyth – Miss Arkansas USA 2006
 Brad Fuller – video game composer (M.S. technology management 2006)
Lillian Glass – author, TV commentator, body language expert
 Madison Hildebrand – star of Bravo Channel's Million Dollar Listing
 Darby Hinton – actor, Daniel Boone
 Adam Housley – Fox News Channel Los Angeles correspondent, former Milwaukee Brewers and Detroit Tigers baseball player
 Porntip Nakhirunkanok (Bui Simon) – Miss Universe 1988 and Miss Thailand 1988
 Kelly Hu – Miss Teen USA 1985 and actress
 Dean Huh- Writer, Producer By the Sea, The Hasty Pudding Awards, The Hola Awrds  
 Ashley Jones – television actress, The Bold and the Beautiful
 Montell Jordan – R&B recording artist famous for his hit 1995 single, "This is How We Do It"
 Till Kahrs – recording artist, singer-songwriter, communication skills expert
 Marlene King – television writer, creator of Pretty Little Liars
John Lasseter – animator and Chief Creative Officer of Pixar Entertainment
 Carla Laureano – RITA award-winning author of Five Days in Skye
 Coco Lee - member of K-pop duo CocoSori
 Jeff Loveness – screenwriter, Jimmy Kimmel Live!, Rick and Morty, Ant-Man and the Wasp: Quantumania
 Chloe Lukasiak – Dance Moms
 Kate Mansi – television actress, Days of Our Lives
 Rob Moore – Vice Chairman of Paramount Pictures
 Shana Morrison – singer/songwriter
 Tahj Mowry – television actor, the WB's Smart Guy and ABC Family's Baby Daddy
 Tamera Mowry – television actress, ABC and The WB Sister, Sister, Lifetime Television's Strong Medicine, and co-host and producer of The Real
 Tia Mowry – television actress, ABC and WB sitcom Sister, Sister, BET's The Game and Netflix's  Family Reunion
 Brandy Norwood – Grammy Award-winning R&B artist, television, movie and Broadway actress, UPN sitcom Moesha , BET's The Game and Kennedy Center's Chicago.
 Eric Christian Olsen – actor
 Mike Richards – executive producer, The Price Is Right, Let's Make a Deal, Wheel of Fortune, Jeopardy!
 Meredith Salenger – actress
 George Schlatter – Emmy-winning television producer and director, Rowan & Martin's Laugh-In
 Francesca Marie Smith – voice actress, Helga Pataki on Hey Arnold!
 Matt "Money" Smith – southern California sports radio personality
 Clayton Snyder – actor, sitcom Lizzie McGuire
 Pandora Vanderpump – writer, director and producer
 Michael Waldron – screenwriter, Rick and Morty, Loki, Doctor Strange in the Multiverse of Madness
 David N. Weiss – screenwriter, The Rugrats Movie, Shrek 2, The Smurfs
 John Arthur Hill – Actor, SiriusXM Host on Radio Andy

Literature and the arts
Pierce Brown – author of the sci-fi dystopian Red Rising series
Sharon M. Draper – realistic fiction and Young-adult fiction novelist
Jamie J. Quatro – literary fiction writer
Rebecca Zanetti – romance novelist

Fine arts
Kevin A. Short – painter and printmaker

Media
Stefan Holt - (B.A., 2009) - news anchor for WNBC-TV, New York
Adam Housley (B.A. 1994) – national correspondent for Fox News Channel, Emmy winner
Michelle Fields (B.A., 2011) – political reporter
Anna Song (B.A., 1999) – KATU investigative reporter, weekend anchor (1999–present), 2007 Emmy for Human Interest News Series, 2007 Regional Edward R. Murrow award for investigative reporting
Bill Weir – co-anchor of ABC News Nightline
Joel Widzer (B.S., 1986) – author and correspondent, MSNBC

Politics and government
André Birotte Jr. (J.D., 1991) – Judge of the United States District Court for the Central District of California, 2014–present
Rod Blagojevich (J.D., 1983) – Governor of Illinois, 2003–2009
Jeffrey Boyd (J.D., 1991) – Justice of the Supreme Court of Texas, 2012–present; former editor-in-chief of the Pepperdine Law Review
Mike Cernovich (J.D., 2004) - Political commentator, social media personality, and conspiracy theorist.
Talis Colberg (J.D., 1983) – Attorney General of Alaska, 2006–2009
Chris DeRose (J.D., 2005) – Clerk of the Superior Court of Maricopa County, Arizona, 2018–2019
Jennifer Dorsey (J.D., 1997) – Judge of the United States District Court for the District of Nevada, 2013–present
Paris Dennard (B.A., 2005) – Republican Party political strategist
Colleen Graffy (B.A., 1979) – U.S. Deputy Assistant Secretary of State for Public Diplomacy, 2005–2009
Ivan Doly Gultom (1991) - Member of the People's Representative Council of Indonesia, 2017–present
James Hahn (B.A., 1972; J.D., 1975) – Mayor of Los Angeles, 2001–2005; Judge of the Los Angeles County Superior Court, 2008–present
Janice Hahn – U.S. Representative, 2011–2016, California's 36th Congressional District and California's 44th Congressional District; Supervisor of the Los Angeles County Board of Supervisors, 2016–present
Brian Jack (B.A., 2010) – White House Political Director, 2019–2021
Ted Kanavas – State Senator, Wisconsin State Senate, 2001–2011
Michelle King - Superintendent of Los Angeles Unified School District, 2016-2018 
Joel Kleefisch (B.A., 1993) – State Representative, Wisconsin State Assembly, 2005–2019
Jami Miscik (1980) – Director of the Office of International Affairs, CIA
Khalid Abdul Muhammad African American black nationalist who came to prominence as a leader in the Nation of Islam and then the New Black Panther Party. After a racially inflammatory 1993 speech at Kean College, Muhammad was condemned and removed from his position in the Nation of Islam by Louis Farrakhan
Danielle Outlaw – Chief of the Portland Police Bureau
Bernard C. Parks – Los Angeles City Councilman, 8th District, former Los Angeles Police Chief
Todd Russell Platts (J.D., 1991) – U.S. Congressman from Pennsylvania, 2001–2013
Amb. Pierre-Richard Prosper (J.D., 1989) – United States Ambassador-at-Large for War Crimes Issues
Robin Sax (J.D., 1997) – author, legal analyst, victim advocate, former prosecutor for Los Angeles County District Attorney's Office
Diana Shaw - Acting Inspector General of the Department of State
Arthur K. Snyder – Los Angeles City Council member, 1967–1985
Michelle Steel (B.S., 1997) – U.S. Representative, 2021–present, California's 48th Congressional District
Kimberly Yee – Arizona State Treasurer, 2019–present

Religion
Paul Egertson (B.A., 1955) – Bishop of the Evangelical Lutheran Church in America

Sports

Alex Acker (2005) – professional basketball player (2005–06; 2008–09 Detroit Pistons, Los Angeles Clippers)
Brandon Armstrong (2001) – former professional basketball player (2001–04; New Jersey Nets)
Sarah Attar – Olympic 800 meter runner
Dain Blanton (1994) – 2000 Olympic gold medalist in beach volleyball
Ricardo Brown (1980) – basketball player drafted in 1979 by Houston Rockets; Southern California Player of the Year in 1979; played professional basketball in the Philippine Basketball Association (1983–90); member of PBA Hall of Fame (2009) and Pepperdine University Hall of Fame (1995)
Richard Cho – former General Manager of Portland Trail Blazers
Doug Christie (1992) – retired professional basketball player (1992–2007; Los Angeles Lakers, New York Knicks, Toronto Raptors, Sacramento Kings, Orlando Magic, Dallas Mavericks and Los Angeles Clippers)
Bob Ctvrtlik (1985) – 1988 Olympic gold medal volleyball team member, member of International Olympic Committee
Yakhouba Diawara (2005) – power forward for the Miami Heat
Craig Edwards – former professional tennis player, semi-finalist in doubles at 1980 Australian Open.
Eddie Edwards – former professional tennis player, 42 ATP singles, 40 ATP doubles
Barry Enright (2007) – pitcher for the Arizona Diamondbacks
Jim Everett – former NFL QB, received his MBA from Pepperdine
Mike Fetters – former professional baseball player (1989–2004; California Angels, Milwaukee Brewers, Oakland Athletics, Baltimore Orioles, Los Angeles Dodgers, Pittsburgh Pirates, Arizona Diamondbacks and Minnesota Twins)
Greg Genske – sports agent
Brad Gilbert (1982) – former world # 4 tennis player; prominent coach of Andre Agassi, Andy Murray
Jason Gore (2000) – professional golfer
Dan Haren – professional baseball player; 2007 A.L. All Star Starting Pitcher (Arizona Diamondbacks, Los Angeles Angels of Anaheim)
Ginger Helgeson-Nielsen – former professional tennis player who holds the all-time match winning percentage at Pepperdine
Kim Hill (2013) – USA Volleyball National Team
Adam Housley (1994) – former professional minor league baseball player, drafted by the Montreal Expos
Katherine Hull (2003) – professional golfer
Daniel Johnson (2008) – professional basketball player (Adelaide 36ers, Australasian NBL)
Dennis Johnson (1976) – Basketball Hall of Famer, former professional basketball player (1977–90; Seattle SuperSonics, Phoenix Suns and Boston Celtics)
Chad Kreuter – former professional baseball player (1988–2003; Texas Rangers, Detroit Tigers, Seattle Mariners, Chicago White Sox, Anaheim Angels, Kansas City Royals and Los Angeles Dodgers)
Jennifer Lacy – professional basketball player, Phoenix Mercury and Atlanta Dream
Robert Lansdorp - Professional tennis coach who coached several players to #1 in the world
Martin Laurendeau – former professional tour tennis player
Mike Leach – head football coach at Texas Tech 2000–2009, Washington State 2012–2019 and Mississippi State 2020-present
Noah Lowry – professional baseball player (San Francisco Giants)
 Stacy Margolin (born 1959) - tennis player
Boaz Merenstein (born 1970) - Israeli tennis player
Glenn Michibata – former professional tour tennis player
Tim Montez (1984) – college baseball coach of Jacksonville
Jon Moscot – American-Israeli major league baseball pitcher (Cincinnati Reds)
Merrill Moses (2000) – water polo goalie for USA national team (2008 Olympic silver medalist)
David Newhan – professional baseball player (Houston Astros)
Will Ohman – professional baseball player (Los Angeles Dodgers)
Leo Palin - Former professional tennis player, 92 singles ATP, 111 doubles ATP
Rob Picciolo – former professional baseball player (1977–85; Oakland Athletics, Milwaukee Brewers and California Angels)
Steve Rodriguez, major league infielder for the Boston Red Sox and Detroit Tigers; player and head coach for the Waves baseball team
Sean Rooney (2004) – USA men's national volleyball team, 2008 gold medalist
Dane Sardinha – professional baseball player (Detroit Tigers)
Mike Scott – former professional baseball player (1979–91; New York Mets and Houston Astros) and winner of the 1986 NL Cy Young Award
Jesse Smith – USA men's water polo Olympic team 2000, 2004, 2008 (2008 Olympic silver medalist)
João Soares - former professional tennis player. 74 ATP singles. 49 ATP doubles. 
Andy Stankiewicz – former professional baseball player (1992–98; New York Yankees, Houston Astros, Montreal Expos and Arizona Diamondbacks)
Andrew Sznajder – former professional tour tennis player
Eric Thames - professional baseball player for the Milwaukee Brewers
Malcolm Thomas – professional basketball player for Utah Jazz
Derek Wallace – former professional baseball player (1996–99; New York Mets and Kansas City Royals)
Robbie Weiss – former professional tennis player
Randy Wolf – professional baseball player
Danny Worth – professional baseball player (Detroit Tigers)

Notable faculty
 Michael Crooke, assistant professor of strategy; founding and lead professor of the Socially, Environmentally, and Ethically Responsible (SEER) Certificate program, Graziadio School of Business and Management; former Navy SEAL; CEO of Patagonia, Inc. (1999–2006)
 Geraldine Decker, opera singer with the Metropolitan Opera
 Craig Detweiler, director of Center for Entertainment, Media, and Culture
 Joel S. Fetzer, distinguished professor of political science
 Allen Fox (born 1939), tennis player (ranked as high as # 4) and coach
 Bruce Herschensohn (born 1932), senior fellow School of Public Policy
 Linda Livingstone, dean of the Graziadio School of Business and Management (2002-2014)
 Merrill Moses (born 1977), Associate Head Coach in water polo, three-time Olympian and silver medalist
 Christopher Parkening, distinguished professor of music
 L. Timothy Perrin, former law school vice dean (2007–2012), former president of sister school Lubbock Christian University (2012–2019)
 Kenneth Starr, former law school dean
 Ben Stein, law professor (1990–97)
 Eliot Teltscher (born 1959), professional tennis player
 Cornell West (born 1953), American philosopher, political activist, social critic, actor, and public intellectual

References

External links
 Pepperdine University Alumni Association

Pepperdine University